This is a list of the French Singles & Airplay Chart Reviews number-ones of 1976.

Summary

Singles Chart

See also
1976 in music
List of number-one hits (France)

References

1976 in France
1976 record charts
Lists of number-one songs in France